Antonio I (25 January 1661 – 20 February 1731) was the sovereign Prince of Monaco from 1701 to 1731. He was the elder son of Louis I of Monaco and Catherine Charlotte de Gramont.

In 1683, Antonio was named lieutenant in the Régiment du Roi Infanterie.  In 1684, he was named colonel of the regiment of Soissonois.  During the Nine Years War he was present at the Battle of Philippsburg (1688), the Battle of Fleurus (1690), the Siege of Mons (1691), and the Siege of Namur (1692).

On 21 August 1702, Antonio took the oath to King Louis XIV of France in the Parlement on account of being Duke of Valentinois and a Peer of France.  He was made a knight of the French royal orders in 1724.

He "completed the fortifications of the Rock of Monaco, constructed the Oreillon and the Fort Antoine." Finally, he formed a "brilliant Court in his palace." He constructed the Rampe Major in 1714; this was an improved road connecting La Condamine to the "platform of the peninsula." The Oreillon tower commanding the ramp leading to the Palais Princier was constructed between 1707-1708.

Marriage and children

Antonio married 13 June 1688 Marie de Lorraine, "Mademoiselle d'Armagnac" (12 August 1674 – 30 October 1724), daughter of Louis, Count of Armagnac.

They had six daughters, of whom only three survived infancy :
Caterina Charlotte (7 October 1691 – 18 June 1696), "Mademoiselle de Monaco".
Louise Hippolyte (10 November 1697 – 29 December 1731), successor of her father.
Elisabetta Charlotte (3 November 1698 – 25 August 1702), "Mademoiselle de Valentinois".
Margherita Camilla (1 May 1700 – 27 April 1758), "Mademoiselle de Carlades"; married on 16 April 1720 to Louis de Gand-Vilain, Prince of Isenghien and marshal of France.
Maria Devota (15 March 1702 – 24 October 1703), "Mademoiselle des Baux".
Maria Paolina Theresa Devota (23 October 1708 – 20 May 1726), "Mademoiselle de Chabreuil'".

Antonio also had a number of illegitimate children:
with Elisabeth Durfort (a dancer)
Antoine Grimaldi (1697–1784), known as the Chevalier de Grimaldiwith Victoire Vertu (dancer at the Paris opera)
Antoinette Grimaldi, called mademoiselle de Saint-Rémywith an unknown woman
Louise Marie Thérèse Grimaldi (1705–1723)

Ancestors

Further reading
 Pemberton, H. The History of Monaco: Past and Present. Tinsley Brothers. London: 1867. URL: https://archive.org/details/historyofmonacop00pemb
 Schwennicke, Detlev (Ed.) Europäische Stammtafeln'', J.A. Stargardt Verlag, Marburg, volume II, table 201.

References

1661 births
1731 deaths
18th-century Princes of Monaco
18th-century peers of France
House of Grimaldi
Princes of Monaco
Marquesses of Baux
Monegasque princes
Hereditary Princes of Monaco
Burials at the Cathedral of Our Lady Immaculate
People of Ligurian descent
Dukes of Valentinois